Gastric dilatation volvulus (GDV), also known as gastric dilation, twisted stomach, or gastric torsion, is a medical condition that affects dogs in which the stomach becomes overstretched and rotated by excessive gas content. The word bloat is often used as a general term to mean gas distension without stomach torsion (a normal change after eating), or to refer to GDV.

GDV is a life-threatening condition in dogs that requires prompt treatment. It is common in certain breeds; deep-chested breeds are especially at risk. Mortality rates in dogs range from 10 to 60%, even with treatment. With surgery, the mortality rate is 15 to 33 percent.

Symptoms
Symptoms are not necessarily distinguishable from other kinds of distress. A dog might stand uncomfortably and seem to be in extreme discomfort for no apparent reason. Other possible symptoms include firm distension of the abdomen, weakness, depression, difficulty breathing, hypersalivation, and retching without producing any vomitus (nonproductive vomiting). Many dogs with GDV have cardiac arrhythmias (40% in one study). Chronic GDV in dogs, include symptoms such as loss of appetite, vomiting, and weight loss.

Causes
Gastric dilatation volvulus in dogs is likely caused by a multitude of factors, but in all cases the immediate prerequisite is a dysfunction of the sphincter between the esophagus and stomach and an obstruction of outflow through the pylorus. Some of the more widely acknowledged factors for developing GDV include increased age, breed, having a deep and narrow chest, eating foods, such as kibble, that expand in the stomach, overfeeding, too much water consumption in a small period of time before or after exercise, and other causes of gastrointestinal disease and distress. The risk of bloat in dogs perceived as happy by their owners is decreased, and increased in dogs perceived as fearful. This may be owing to the physiological effects of the dog's personality on the function and motility of the gastrointestinal system. Alternatively, the dogs may become unhappy/uncomfortable as a consequence of the conditions that lead up to exhibiting bloat. Dogs with inflammatory bowel disease may be at an increased risk for bloat.

Dietary factors
One common recommendation in the past has been to raise the food bowl of dogs when they eat, but this may actually increase the risk of GDV. One study looking at the ingredients of dry dog food found that while neither grains, soy, nor animal proteins increased risk of bloat, foods containing an increased amount of added oils or fats do increase the risk, possibly owing to delayed emptying of the stomach.

Pathophysiology
The stomach twists around the longitudinal axis of the digestive tract, also known as volvulus. Gas distension may occur prior to or after the stomach twists. The most common direction for rotation is clockwise, viewing the animal from behind. The stomach can rotate up to 360° in this direction and 90° counterclockwise. If the volvulus is greater than 180°, the esophagus is closed off, thereby preventing the animal from relieving the condition by belching or vomiting. The results of this distortion of normal anatomy and gas distension include hypotension (low blood pressure), decreased return of blood to the heart, ischemia (loss of blood supply) of the stomach, and shock. Pressure on the portal vein decreases blood flow to liver and decreases the ability of that organ to remove toxins and absorbed bacteria from the blood. At the other end of the stomach, the spleen may be damaged if the twisting interrupts its blood supply. If not quickly treated, bloat can lead to blood poisoning, peritonitis, and death by toxic shock.

Diagnosis

A diagnosis of GDV is made by several factors. The breed and history often gives a significant suspicion of the  condition, and a physical examination often reveals the telltale sign of a distended abdomen with abdominal tympany. Shock is diagnosed by the presence of pale mucous membranes with poor capillary refill, increased heart rate, and poor pulse quality. Radiographs (X-rays), usually taken after decompression of the stomach if the dog is unstable, shows a stomach distended with gas. The pylorus, which normally is ventral and to the right of the body of the stomach, is cranial to the body of the stomach and left of the midline, often separated on the X-ray by soft tissue and giving the appearance of a separate gas-filled pocket (double-bubble sign).

Treatment
Gastric dilatation volvulus is an emergency medical condition; having the animal examined by a veterinarian is imperative. GDV can become fatal within a matter of minutes.

Treatment usually involves resuscitation with intravenous fluid therapy, usually a combination of isotonic fluids and hypertonic saline or a colloidal solution such as hetastarch, and emergency surgery. The stomach is initially decompressed by passing a stomach tube, or if that is not possible, trocars can be passed through the skin into the stomach to remove the gas, alternatively the trocars may be inserted directly into the stomach following anaesthesia  to reduce the chances of infection. During surgery, the stomach is placed back into its correct position, and the abdomen is examined for any devitalized tissue (especially the stomach and spleen). A partial gastrectomy may be necessary if  any necrosis of the stomach wall occurs.

Prevention
Recurrence of GDV attacks can be a problem, occurring in up to 80% of dogs treated medically only (without surgery). To prevent recurrence, at the same time the bloat is treated surgically, a right-side gastropexy is often performed, which by a variety of methods firmly attaches the stomach wall to the body wall, to prevent it from twisting inside the abdominal cavity in the future. While dogs that have had gastropexies still may develop gas distension of the stomach,  a significant reduction in recurrence of gastric volvulus is seen. Of 136 dogs that had surgery for gastric dilatation-volvulus, six that did have gastropexies had a recurrence, while 74 (54.5%) of those without the additional surgery recurred. Gastropexies are also performed prophylactically in dogs considered to be at high risk of GDV, including dogs with previous episodes  or with gastrointestinal disease predisposing to GDV, and dogs with a first-order relative (parent or sibling) with a history of it.

Precautions that are likely to help prevent gastric dilatation-volvulus include feeding small meals throughout the day instead of one big meal, and not exercising immediately before or after a meal.

Prognosis
Immediate treatment is the most important factor in a favorable prognosis. A delay in treatment greater than 6 hours or the presence of peritonitis, sepsis, hypotension, or disseminated intravascular coagulation are negative prognostic indicators.

Historically, GDV has held a guarded prognosis. Although "early studies showed mortality rates between 33 and 68% for dogs with GDV," studies from 2007 to 2012 "reported mortality rates between 10 and 26.8%". Mortality rates approach 10 to 40% even with treatment. With prompt treatment and good preoperative stabilization of the patient, mortality is significantly lessened to 10% overall (in a referral setting). Negative prognostic indicators following surgical intervention include postoperative cardiac arrhythmia, splenectomy, or splenectomy with partial gastric resection. A longer time from presentation to surgery was associated with a lower mortality, presumably because these dogs had received more complete preoperative fluid resuscitation, thus were better cardiovascularly stabilized prior to the procedure.

Epidemiology
As a general rule, GDV is of greatest risk to deep-chested dogs. The five breeds at greatest risk are Great Danes, Weimaraners, St. Bernards, Gordon Setters, and Irish Setters. In fact, the lifetime risk for a Great Dane to develop GDV has been estimated to be close to 37%. Standard Poodles are also at risk for this health problem, as are Irish Wolfhounds, German Shorthaired Pointers, German Shepherds, and Rhodesian Ridgebacks.

Society and culture
In the novel and film Marley & Me, Marley develops and ultimately dies of "bloat". 
In "Dog of Death," an episode of the animated TV series The Simpsons, the family dog Santa's Little Helper develops a "twisted stomach", necessitating surgery.

References

Dog diseases